Alpha Alexander (born June 9, 1954 in Nashville, Tennessee) was co-founder of the Black Women in Sport Foundation.

Early life and education 
Alpha Alexander was born June 9, 1954 in Nashville, Tennessee to parents Alpha Omega Alexander and Rufus S. Alexander. Alexander's mother, Alpha Omega Alexander was an elementary school teacher in Dayton, Ohio. Alexander's father graduated from the University of Wisconsin and worked for the United States Post Office. Alexander later moved to Dayton, Ohio where she grew up. Alexander attended Blairwood Elementary and went to Jefferson High School. Alexander was unable to play sports at Jefferson High School due to sports not being offered to girls. Alexander then went on to attend The College of Wooster in 1976 where she attained her bachelor's degree in Physical Education. While there she played Volleyball (1973-1975), Lacrosse, Tennis, and Basketball (1972-1976). Alexander earned her master's degree in 1978 and Doctorate degree in 1981 at Temple University in Pennsylvania.

Career 
In 1976 a Alexander began her career as a graduate assistant in Women's Athletics at Temple University. She was the Assistant Women's Athletic Director while there from 1980-1983 and the Women's Athletic Director in 1981–1983. She went on to work at Women's Sports Foundation 1985–1986. In 1986 she worked at the YWCA of San Francisco as Health and Wellness Director until 1987 until she became the health and sports advocacy for YWCA of the USA National Office. In 1990 Alexander became special assistant to the chief executive officer of the YWCA. Alexander then worked as Chancellor to the New York City Board of Education Office in 2000–2001. Alexander taught at Walter State Community College from 2001-2005 and Lane College from 2005–2007. Alexander served on the Olympic and Pan-American Sports Advisory Council, the United States Olympic Committee Board of Directors, and was president of the Arthur Ashe Foundation. In 1992 Alexander co founded the Black Women in Sport Foundation with Tina Sloan Green, Nikki Franke, and Linda Greene. They met while at Temple University. Currently Alexander is the chairperson of the Morristown Taskforce on Diversity.

Awards and honors 
College of Wooster Hall of Fame -1993

Black Enterprise Magazine (as one of the 30 most valuable professionals in the business of sports in the USA ) -1995

Women's Sports Foundation President Award-1995

Olympic Shield Award (2nd Woman ever to receive this award from US Olympic Committee) -1996

New York Times Women of the Year Sport Award-1996

Billie Jean King Contribution Award (Women Sports Foundation) -1997,

NCAA Silver Anniversary Award- 2001

NCAA 100 Most Influential Student Athletes in History (ESPN Classic) -2006

College of Wooster Distinguished Alumni -2008

National Girls and Women Sport Award from AAHPERD (previous year winners were Michelle Obama and Pat Head Summit) -2013 

1019 Black Woman In Sport Foundation Glass Ceiling Breaker Award- 2019

Publications 
They Carried Us: The Social Impact of Philadelphia's Black Women Leaders (Alexander is showcased in this book)

References 

1954 births
Living people
African-American sportswomen
Athletic directors
College of Wooster alumni
Temple University College of Education alumni
Temple University people
21st-century African-American people
20th-century African-American sportspeople